What Do I Have To Do? is the second compilation album released on Sony Music by the American industrial rock band Stabbing Westward. The album was released on August 31, 2003, a year after the band broke up on February 9, 2002. It features ten tracks from their three albums released in the 1990s: Ungod (1994), Wither Blister Burn & Peel (1996), and Darkest Days (1998). The songs "Save Yourself" and "The Thing I Hate" have censored lyrics in this release.

Track listing

Stabbing Westward albums
2003 compilation albums
Columbia Records compilation albums